Edmundoa perplexa is a plant species in the genus Edmundoa. This species is endemic to Brazil.

References

perplexa
Flora of Brazil